This is the discography of English singer Adam Faith.

Albums

Studio albums

Live albums

Soundtrack and cast recording albums

Compilation albums

EPs

Singles

Notes

References

Discographies of British artists
Pop music discographies
Rock music discographies